Joo Seung-Jin (born March 12, 1975) is a South Korean former professional  football player who mainly played as a defender. He played mainly as a side attacker on the right side but has also played in many different positions such as either defending or attacking middle fielder. Joo SeungJin made more than 160 Football League appearances in South Korea, most prominently for Daejeon Citizen and Busan I'Park (formerly Daejeon Citizen).

In terms of his coaching history, he began to coach at U-15 Suwon Samsung Bluewings as an assistant coach. After two years, he took the position as a head coach at U-15 Suwon Samsung Bluewings for three years and another three years as a head coach at U-18 Suwon Samsung Bluewings. During the time when he was a head coach of U-18, he was appointed as a director of whole youth academy at Suwon Samsung Bluewings. Now, he is the current assist coach of Suwon Samsung Bluewings first team.

Into coaching 
As shown above, he took his first steps into coaching with professional football youth team called "Suwon Samsung Bluewings" U-15 as a coach from 2010–2011. After two years with his enthusiasm into coaching, he progressed as the Head coach of U-15, leading them into the K-League Junior Champions for three years from 2012–2015. With these excellent results Suwon Samsung Bluewings promoted him into the Head coach of U-18 in 2016. No doubt that he also made amazing results, lifting U-18 three K-League Junior Champions for three years from 2016–2018. In 2018, he was appointed First Head of Whole Suwon Samsung Bluewings Youth Academy.

Honours

Managerial
Suwon Samsung Bluewings
 2012 National Spring Football Confederation U-15 wins
 2012-2014 Oryonggi tournament U-15 win three consecutive years
 2014 National King's Cup U-15 wins
 2015 National Championship U-15 wins
 2015 National Spring Manchester United Cup U-15 wins
 2016 The second half of the U-18 National King of K-League Junior wins
 2017 National Football Confederation U-18 wins
 2017 K-League Junior U-18 win in the first half
 2017 The King of K-League Junior First Half U-18 wins
 2017,18 K-League Junior Championship U-17 wins
 2018 National Spring Football Confederation U-18 wins
 2018 k-League Pre and Post Championship wins

References

External links 
 

South Korean footballers
Busan IPark players
Daejeon Hana Citizen FC players
K League 1 players
1975 births
Living people
Association football defenders